The national emblem of the North Ossetian Autonomous Soviet Socialist Republic was adopted in 1940 by the government of the North Ossetian Autonomous Soviet Socialist Republic. The emblem is identical to the emblem of the Russian Soviet Federative Socialist Republic.

History

First version 
The emblem was described in the 1940 Constitution of the North Ossetian ASSR.

Second version 
In 1978 the design of the coat of arms underwent minor change. The emblem was supplemented with a star.

Gallery 

North Ossetian Autonomous Soviet Federative Socialist Republic
North Ossetian ASSR
North Ossetian ASSR
North Ossetian ASSR
North Ossetian ASSR
North Ossetian ASSR